The Tolstoy Cup is an annual football match played between the students of the Department of Peace Studies at the University of Bradford and the Department of War Studies at King's College London since 2007, though the match was first played in 1994. The competition is named after War and Peace, the 1869 novel written by the Russian author Leo Tolstoy.

Rivalry
The rivalry between "Peace Studies" and "War Studies" is one of the great sporting rivalries, being featured at number four on the Financial Times list of "Great college sports rivalries". Although it does not match the history or tradition of university rivalries such as the Oxford and Cambridge Boat Race, the competition is still often covered by the national media including the BBC, The Independent and Bradford's Telegraph and Argus. The second leg of the 2007 match played at Bradford City's Valley Parade attracted over 200 spectators. King's College London itself has a longer standing rivalry with UCL, particularly involving rugby union.

Symbolism
Symbolically, War Studies adopt a red and black stripe, while Peace Studies typically play in light blue colours. Rather than their own, both sides have at times played with the names of notable figures related to their studied disciplines on their shirts: 'D. Lama', 'M. L. King' and 'Gandhi' for Peace and 'Nelson', 'Caesar' and 'Clausewitz' for War.

Trophy
The "trophy" for the Tolstoy Cup has in prior years constituted a framed copy of Leo Tolstoy's novel War and Peace. The trophy first came into use in 2007. It is kept by the department of the current winners. The Department of War Studies at King's College London currently hold the trophy.

The book used since 2007 was last used following the 2011 match due to its fragile state after 5 years of use and was replaced with a newer copy. It has since been superseded by a conventional trophy. The original trophy is now permanently displayed in Weickartshain, Germany.

Results

References

External links
Photoset of War vs Peace Second Leg Flickr photoset of second-leg 2007 game. Photography by Oliver Collinge
Winning Penalty and Celebrations of Peace Victory YouTube
Photos of War vs Peace First Leg Series of photos on YouTube
King's College London, Department of War Studies
Bradford University, Department of Peace Studies

Student sport rivalries in the United Kingdom
University of Bradford
King's College London
Recurring sporting events established in 1995
1995 establishments in England
Football competitions in England